Andy Jones-Wilkins (born 1968) is an elite ultra runner and educator. He began running ultramarathons in 1996 and 100-mile ultras in 2000, and became known for frequently finishing among the top few, without ever winning a race. This included, in 2005, coming in 2nd overall in the Western States 100 Mile, the Angeles Crest 100 Mile, and the Rocky Raccoon 100 Mile, though he won the Where's Waldo 100k. This changed in 2007, when he took first place in both the Vermont 100 Mile and the Grand Teton 100 Mile, also setting a new course record in the Grand Teton 100 Mile.

Better known by his nickname, "AJW", he is a member of the Patagonia Ultrarunning Team. Jones-Wilkins is best known as being a seven-times consecutive Western States Top-Ten Finisher (2004–2011). He lives in Pennsylvania, where he is currently working in education.
Mr Jones-Wilkins is also a columnist for the Ultramarathon running website, iRunFar.com, penning the weekly column, "AJW's Taproom" and frequent contributor as East Coast Executive Producer of Trail Runner Nation podcast. He is also occasional guest of the "Mountain Outpost" news series by the nickname "Jizzle whizzle (from the Beast Coast)" balancing the news cast by providing more East Coast related information.

Mr Jones-Wilkins is Married to Shelly Jones-Wilkins, and has three sons; Carson, Logan, and Tully Jones-Wilkins.

Notes

American male long-distance runners
1968 births
Living people